Cladonia pleurota is a species of fruticose, cup lichen in the family Cladoniaceae. It was first formally described as a new species by German lichenologist Heinrich Gustav Flörke in 1808 as Capitularia pleurota. Ludwig Emanuel Schaerer transferred it to the genus Cladonia in 1850. In North America, it is known colloquially as the red-fruited pixie cup or the red-fruited cup lichen.

See also
List of Cladonia species

References

pleurota
Lichen species
Lichens described in 1808
Lichens of Europe
Lichens of North America
Taxa named by Heinrich Gustav Flörke